The Pittsburgh Steelers are a professional American football team based in Pittsburgh. The Steelers compete in the National Football League (NFL) as a member club of the American Football Conference (AFC) North Division.

In contrast with their status as perennial also-rans in the pre-merger NFL, where they were the oldest team never to have won a league championship, the Steelers of the post-merger (modern) era are among the most successful NFL franchises, especially during their dynasty in the 1970s. The team is tied with the New England Patriots for the most Super Bowl titles at six, and they have both played in (16 times) and hosted (11 times) more conference championship games than any other team in the NFL. The Steelers have also won eight AFC championships, tied with the Denver Broncos, but behind the Patriots' record 11 AFC championships. The team is tied with the Broncos and Dallas Cowboys for the second-most Super Bowl appearances with eight.

The Steelers, whose history may be traced to a regional pro team that was established in the early 1920s, joined the NFL as the Pittsburgh Pirates on July 8, 1933. The team was owned by Art Rooney and took its original name from the baseball team of the same name, as was common practice for NFL teams at the time. To distinguish them from the baseball team, local media took to calling the football team the Rooneymen, an unofficial nickname that persisted for decades after the team had adopted its current nickname. The ownership of the Steelers has remained within the Rooney family since the organization's founding. Art Rooney's son, Dan Rooney, owned the team from 1988 until his death in 2017. Much control of the franchise has been given to Dan Rooney's son, Art Rooney II.

The Steelers enjoy a large, widespread fanbase nicknamed Steeler Nation. They currently play their home games at Acrisure Stadium on Pittsburgh's North Side in the North Shore neighborhood, which also hosts the University of Pittsburgh Panthers. Built in 2001 as Heinz Field, the stadium replaced Three Rivers Stadium, which had hosted the Steelers for 31 seasons. Prior to Three Rivers, the Steelers had played their games in Pitt Stadium and at Forbes Field.

Franchise history

Rooney family era (1933-present) 
The Pittsburgh Steelers of the NFL first took to the field as the Pittsburgh Pirates on September 20, 1933, losing 23–2 to the New York Giants. Through the 1930s, the Pirates never finished higher than second place in their division, or with a record better than .500. Prior to the 1940 season, the Pirates renamed themselves the Steelers.

During World War II, the Steelers experienced player shortages. They twice merged with other NFL franchises to field a team. During the 1943 season, they merged with the Philadelphia Eagles forming the "Phil-Pitt Eagles" and were known as the "Steagles". This team went 5–4–1. In 1944, they merged with the Chicago Cardinals and were known as Card-Pitt (or, mockingly, as the "Carpets"). This team finished 0–10, marking the only winless team in franchise history.

This forced a tie-breaking playoff game at Forbes Field, which the Steelers lost 21–0. That would be Pittsburgh's only playoff game in the pre-merger era; they did qualify for a "Playoff Bowl" in 1962 as the second-best team in their conference, but this was not considered an official playoff.

In , the year they moved into Three Rivers Stadium and the year of the AFL–NFL merger, the Pittsburgh Steelers were one of three old-guard NFL teams to switch to the newly formed American Football Conference (the others being the Cleveland Browns and the Baltimore Colts), in order to equalize the number of teams in the two conferences of the newly merged league. The Steelers also received a $3 million ($ million today) relocation fee, which was a windfall for them; for years they rarely had enough to build a true contending team.

Chuck Noll years (1969-1991) 

The Steelers' history of bad luck changed with the hiring of coach Chuck Noll from the NFL champion Baltimore Colts for the 1969 season. Noll's most remarkable talent was in his draft selections, taking Hall of Famers "Mean" Joe Greene in 1969, Terry Bradshaw and Mel Blount in 1970, Jack Ham in 1971, Franco Harris in 1972, and finally, in 1974, pulling off the incredible feat of selecting four Hall of Famers in one draft year, Lynn Swann, Jack Lambert, John Stallworth, and Mike Webster. The Pittsburgh Steelers' 1974 draft was their best ever; no other team has ever drafted four future Hall of Famers in one year, and only very few (including the 1970 Steelers) have drafted two or more in one year.

The players drafted in the early 1970s formed the base of an NFL dynasty, making the playoffs in eight seasons and becoming the only team in NFL history to win four Super Bowls in six years, as well as the first to win more than two.  They also enjoyed a regular-season streak of 49 consecutive wins (–) against teams that would finish with a losing record that year.

The Steelers suffered a rash of injuries in the 1980 season and missed the playoffs with a 9–7 record. The 1981 season was no better, with an 8–8 showing. The team was then hit with the retirements of all their key players from the Super Bowl years. "Mean" Joe Greene retired after the 1981 season, Lynn Swann and Jack Ham after 1982's playoff berth, Terry Bradshaw and Mel Blount after 1983's divisional championship, and Jack Lambert after 1984's AFC Championship Game appearance.

After those retirements, the franchise skidded to its first losing seasons since 1971. Though still competitive, the Steelers would not finish above .500 in 1985, 1986, and 1988. In 1987, the year of the players' strike, the Steelers finished with a record of 8–7, but missed the playoffs. In 1989, they would reach the second round of the playoffs on the strength of Merrill Hoge and Rod Woodson before narrowly missing the playoffs in each of the next two seasons, Noll's last seasons.

Noll's career record with Pittsburgh was 209–156–1.

Bill Cowher years (1992-2006) 
In 1992, Chuck Noll retired and was succeeded by Kansas City Chiefs defensive coordinator Bill Cowher, a native of the Pittsburgh suburb of Crafton.

Cowher led the Steelers to the playoffs in each of his first six seasons, a feat that had been accomplished only by legendary coach Paul Brown of the Cleveland Browns. In those first six seasons, Cowher coached them as deep as the AFC Championship Game three times and following the 1995 season an appearance in Super Bowl XXX on the strength of the "Blitzburgh" defense. However, the Steelers lost to the Dallas Cowboys in Super Bowl XXX, two weeks after a thrilling AFC Championship victory over the Indianapolis Colts. Cowher produced the franchise's record-tying fifth Super Bowl win in Super Bowl XL over the NFC champion Seattle Seahawks ten years later. With that victory, the Steelers became the third team to win five Super Bowls, and the first sixth-seeded playoff team to reach and win the Super Bowl since the NFL expanded to a 12-team post-season tournament in 1990.  He coached through the 2006 season which ended with an 8–8 record, just short of the playoffs.  Overall Cowher's teams reached the playoffs 10 of 15 seasons with six AFC Championship Games, two Super Bowl berths and a championship.

Cowher's career record with Pittsburgh was 149–90–1 in the regular season and 161–99–1 overall, including playoff games.

Mike Tomlin years (2007-present) 

On January 7, 2007, Cowher resigned from coaching the Steelers, citing a need to spend more time with his family. He did not use the term "retire", leaving open a possible return to the NFL as coach of another team. A three-man committee consisting of Art Rooney II, Dan Rooney, and Kevin Colbert was set up to conduct interviews for the head coaching vacancy. On January 22, 2007, Minnesota Vikings defensive coordinator Mike Tomlin was announced as Cowher's successor as head coach. Tomlin is the first African-American to be named head coach of the team in its 75-year history. Tomlin became the third consecutive Steelers Head Coach to go to the Super Bowl, equaling the Dallas Cowboys (Tom Landry, Jimmy Johnson and Barry Switzer) in this achievement. He was named the Motorola 2008 Coach of the Year. On February 1, 2009, Tomlin led the Steelers to their second Super Bowl of this decade, and went on to win 27–23 against the Arizona Cardinals. At age 36, he was the youngest head coach to ever win the Super Bowl, and he is only the second African-American coach to ever win the Super Bowl (Tony Dungy was the first). The 2010 season made Tomlin the only coach to reach the Super Bowl twice before the age of 40 as he took the team to Super Bowl XLV on February 6, 2011. However, the Steelers were defeated by the Green Bay Packers, 31–25. The Steelers recorded their 400th victory in 2012 after defeating the Washington Redskins.

He is the first Pittsburgh coach to never post a losing season. The 2013–17 seasons were noted for record performances from the "Killer B's". This trio consisted of Antonio Brown, Ben Roethlisberger and Le'Veon Bell. Occasionally, the "Killer B's" has also included kicker Chris Boswell due to his ability to hit game-winning field goals.

Summary 
Since the NFL merger in 1970, the Pittsburgh Steelers have compiled a regular-season record of 444–282–2 (.635) and an overall record of 480-305-2 (.635) including the playoffs, reached the playoffs 30 times, won their division 22 times, played in 16 AFC championship games, and won six of eight Super Bowls. They are also the only NFL team not to have a season with 12 or more losses since the league expanded to a 16-game schedule in 1978.

Ownership 

Since 2008, the Rooney family has brought in several investors for the team while retaining control of the team itself. This came about so that the team could comply with NFL ownership regulations. Dan Rooney, and his son, Art Rooney II, president of the franchise, wanted to stay involved with the franchise, while two of the brothers – Timothy and Patrick – wanted to further pursue racetracks that they own in Florida and New York. Since 2006, many of the racetracks have added video slot machines, causing them to violate "NFL policy that prohibits involvement with racetrack and gambling interests".

Upon Dan Rooney's death in 2017, he and Art Rooney II retained control of the team with the league-minimum 30%, the following make up the other investors:
The Robert A. Paul family of Pittsburgh and Los Angeles, which is primarily involved with Pittsburgh-based Ampco Pittsburgh Corporation as well as Morton's Restaurant Group, Urban Active Fitness, Meyer Products and Harley Marine Services.  Additionally, family members serve on numerous boards, including Cornell University, UPMC, University of Pittsburgh, the American Red Cross, Harvard Medical School and the Loomis Chaffee School.
Former Steelers wide receiver John Stallworth, a member of the Pro Football Hall of Fame.
Several other members of the Rooney family, including Art Rooney Jr., John Rooney, and the McGinley family, who are cousins to the Rooneys.
Legendary Pictures president and CEO Thomas Tull.
GTCR chairman Bruce V. Rauner. 
The Peter Varischetti family of Brockway, which owns several nursing homes and a commercial real estate business.
Paul Evanson, chairman, president, and CEO of Allegheny Energy.
Russ and Scott Swank of Lower Burrell.

Two minority investors the Steelers would bring in during this ownership restructuring have since gone on to become majority owners of their own teams:
Pilot Flying J CEO Jimmy Haslam, who purchsed the Cleveland Browns in 2012. Haslam has since also acquired the Columbus Crew of Major League Soccer.
Hedge fund manager David Tepper, who purchased the Carolina Panthers in 2018. Tepper is a native of Pittsburgh's East Liberty neighborhood.

Both Haslam and Tepper sold off their ownership stakes in the Steelers back to the Rooney family before taking control of their current teams, per NFL rules.

Season-by-season records 

Through the end of the 2021 season, the Steelers have an all-time record of 688–590–22, including playoffs. In recent seasons the Steelers have generally performed well, qualifying for the playoffs six times in the past ten seasons, while winning their division four times.

In the NFL's "modern era" (since the AFL–NFL merger in 1970) the Steelers have posted the best record in the league. In 2017, they became the first team to reach 450 victories in the regular season since the 1970 merger. The franchise has won the most regular-season games, the most playoff games (33 playoff wins; the Dallas Cowboys are second with 32), won the most divisional titles (20), has played in the most conference championship games (15), hosted the most conference championship games (11), and is tied with the Dallas Cowboys, the Denver Broncos and the New England Patriots for the most Super Bowl appearances (8). The Steelers have the best winning percentage (including every expansion team), earned the most All-Pro nominations, and have accumulated the most Super Bowl wins (6) since the modern game started in 1970. In 2017, they became the first team to reach 450 victories in the regular season since the 1970 merger.  The Steelers are 36-26 (.580) in the postseason, with all but one (the 1947 playoff) having been played since the merger.

Civil rights advocacy 
The franchise, along with the Rooney family have for generations been strong advocates for equality of opportunity for both minorities and women.  Among these achievements of the Steelers was the first to hire an African-American assistant coach (September 29, 1957, with Lowell Perry), the first to start an African-American quarterback (December 3, 1973, with Joe Gilliam), the first team to boast of an African-American Super Bowl MVP (January 12, 1975, with Franco Harris), the first to hire an African-American Coordinator (September 2, 1984, with Tony Dungy), the first owner to push for passage of an "equal opportunity" mandating that at least one minority candidate is given an interview in all head coach hiring decisions throughout the league (the Rooney Rule in the early 2000s), and the first to hire a female as full-time athletic trainer (Ariko Iso on July 24, 2002).

Championships

Super Bowl championships

AFC championships

Division championships 
The Steelers were a part of the NFL Eastern Division from 1933 to 1943 and were briefly in the Western Division in 1944, before retuning back to the Eastern Division until 1949. The team was then in the American Conference from 1950 to 1952, and the Eastern Conference from 1953 to 1966. They were then placed in the Century Division of the Eastern Conference in 1967. When the league reformed into the NFC and AFC in 1970, the Steelers were placed in the AFC Central until 2001 when they were realigned into the AFC North Division.

Logo and uniforms 

The Steelers have used black and gold as their colors since the club's inception, the lone exception being the 1943 season when they merged with the Philadelphia Eagles and formed the "Steagles"; the team's colors at that time were green and white as a result of wearing Eagles uniforms. Originally, the team wore solid gold-colored helmets and black jerseys. The Steelers' black and gold colors are now shared by all major professional teams in the city, including the Pittsburgh Pirates in baseball and the Pittsburgh Penguins in ice hockey. The shade of gold differs slightly among teams: the Penguins have previously used "Vegas Gold", a color similar to metallic gold, and the Pirates' gold is a darker mustard yellow-gold, while the Steelers "gold" is more of a bright canary yellow.  Black and gold are also the colors of the city's official flag.

The Steelers logo was introduced in 1962 and is based on the "Steelmark", originally designed by Pittsburgh's U.S. Steel and now owned by the American Iron and Steel Institute (AISI). In fact, it was Cleveland-based Republic Steel that suggested the Steelers adopt the industry logo. It consists of the word "Steelers" surrounded by three astroids (hypocycloids of four cusps). The original meanings behind the astroids were, "Steel lightens your work, brightens your leisure, and widens your world." Later, the colors came to represent the ingredients used in the steel-making process: yellow for coal, red for iron ore, and blue for scrap steel. While the formal Steelmark logo contains only the word "Steel", the team was given permission to add "ers" in 1963 after a petition to AISI.

The Steelers are the only NFL team that puts its logo on only one side of the helmet (the right side). Longtime field and equipment manager Jack Hart was instructed to do this by Art Rooney as a test to see how the logo appeared on the gold helmets; however, its popularity led the team to leave it that way permanently. A year after introducing the logo, they switched to black helmets to make it stand out more.

The Steelers, along with the New York Giants, are one of only two teams in the National Football League to have the players' uniform numbers on both the front and back of the helmets.

In , the team switched to rounded numbers on the jersey to match the number font (Futura Condensed) on the helmets, and a Steelers logo was added to the left side of the jersey.

They were meant to evoke the memory of the – era uniforms. The uniforms were so popular among fans that the Steelers' organization decided to keep them and use them as a third option during home games only.

In 2012, the Steelers introduced a new third uniform, consisting of a yellow jersey with black horizontal lines (making a bumble bee like pattern) with black lettering and black numbers placed inside a white box, to represent the jerseys worn by the Steelers in their 1934 season. The rest of the uniform consists of beige pants, yellow with black horizontal stripped socks, and the Steelers regular black helmet. The uniforms were used for the Steelers' 80th anniversary season. Much like the previous alternate these jerseys were so popular that they were used up through the 2016 season. The jerseys were nicknamed the "bumblebee jerseys" due to looking like the pattern of a bumblebee. The jerseys were retired after the 2016 season.

Also in 2016, the Steelers introduced its alternate black Color Rush uniforms. These were based on the uniforms they wore from 1946 to 1965, but with black pants in place of either gold or white pants.

In 2018, the Steelers unveiled a third uniform based on those worn by the Steel Curtain teams of the 1970s. It is similar to the current uniforms but without the Steelers logo on the left chest and use block lettering and numbers in place of Futura Condensed.

In 1979, the team owners were approached by then-Iowa Hawkeyes Head Coach Hayden Fry about designing his fading college team's uniforms in the image of the Steelers. Three days later, the owners sent Fry the reproduction jerseys (home and away versions) of then quarterback Terry Bradshaw. Today, the Hawkeyes still retain the 1979 Steelers uniforms as their home, and away colors.

Rivals 
The Pittsburgh Steelers have three primary rivals, all within their division: (Cleveland Browns, Baltimore Ravens, and Cincinnati Bengals). They also have rivalries with other teams that arose from post-season battles in the past, most notably the Las Vegas Raiders, Dallas Cowboys, Denver Broncos, New England Patriots, and Tennessee Titans. They also have an intrastate rivalry with the Philadelphia Eagles, but under the current scheduling the teams play each other only once every four years.

Divisional rivals 
The Cleveland Browns and the Steelers have been divisional rivals since the two cities' teams began playing against each other in 1950. After posting a 9–31 record in the first 40 games of the series between the two cities, the Steelers have gone 66–27–1 (including 42–6 in games played in Pittsburgh) since 1970 and currently lead the series 75–58–1; The Steelers have particularly dominated the Browns since their return to the NFL in 1999 and won twelve straight meetings between 2003 and 2009.  Additionally, the Browns posted losing streaks of 16 (1970–85) and 15 (2004–present) games in Pittsburgh. Former Steelers head coach Bill Cowher coached the Browns special teams and secondary before following Marty Schottenheimer for a brief tenure as Kansas City Chiefs defensive coordinator, and then hired by Pittsburgh. This has only intensified the rivalry. The teams have met three times in the postseason (1994, 2002, and 2021) with the Steelers winning the first two meetings, but losing the most recent in 2021.
The Baltimore Ravens and the Steelers have had several memorable match-ups and have a bitter divisional rivalry. Both teams handed the other their first losses at their current home fields. Later that season Pittsburgh won a divisional playoff game 27–10 against Baltimore, who was the defending Super Bowl champion. During their NFL championship season in 2000, the Ravens defeated the Steelers in Pittsburgh, 16–0, in the season opener with the Steelers later exacting revenge, 9–6, in Baltimore (the Ravens' final loss of the season). During the Steelers 2008 Championship run, they beat the Ravens three times, including a win in the AFC Championship game. The two teams complement each other by consistently fielding strong defenses. The Steelers lead the all-time series (including playoffs), 32–24. The teams have met four times in the postseason, with the Steelers owning a 3–1 record.
The Steelers' rivalry with the Cincinnati Bengals dates from the  season, when the AFL–NFL merger was completed. In , the Steelers kept their playoff hopes alive (they later won the division) with a late-season 7–3 win in snowy Cincinnati. One of the most memorable games was the 2005 AFC Wildcard playoff game, in which the Steelers, en route to a Super Bowl title, won a 31–17 come-from-behind victory after Bengals QB Carson Palmer was forced to leave the game with a knee injury. The injury happened when nose tackle Kimo von Oelhoffen contacted Palmer's knee during a passing play. The Bengals players called this a dirty play; the NFL ruled that it was accidental and did not fine von Oelhoffen for the hit. The incident led to an intensifying of the rivalry. The Bengals beat the Steelers in Week 13 of the  season 38–31, and wide receiver T. J. Houshmandzadeh used a Terrible Towel to polish his cleats while walking up the tunnel after the game, fueling the rivalry. The rivalry has become more intense again since the  season. A central figure is Bengals linebacker Vontaze Burfict, often inflicting brutal hits, resulting in serious injuries to several Steelers on multiple occasions. In the 2015 Wild Card playoff game in Cincinnati, Burfict was the culprit of a late penalty directly responsible for an extremely unlikely 18-16 Steelers comeback victory. The Steelers lead the all-time series, 63–35. The teams have met twice in the postseason, with the Steelers winning both times.

Historic rivals

Las Vegas Raiders
The Raiders–Steelers rivalry was one of the most heated of the 1970s and early to mid-1980s. The Steelers' first playoff victory in franchise history was against the Raiders, which occurred on December 23, 1972 in a 13–7 victory over the Raiders; the victory occurred when Terry Bradshaw threw a pass intended for John Fuqua that was deflected into the hands of Franco Harris, who scooped the ball from nearly hitting the ground and carried the ball in for a touchdown, which was later referred to as the Immaculate Reception, while attracting controversy from Raiders players and coaches, who alleged that the ball had bounced off Fuqua, which would have made it an illegal play per the rules of the time. The victory sent Pittsburgh to their first ever AFC Championship Game. The following year, the two teams met in the Divisional Round again, and the Raiders responded with a 33–14 victory to advance to the AFC title game. Oakland responded with a victory over Pittsburgh in the  AFC Championship game 24–7 (the third consecutive AFC title game between the two teams), but not before Chuck Noll referred to Oakland's George Atkinson as part of the NFL's "criminal element" after his alleged cheap-shot on Lynn Swann during a regular-season matchup. Atkinson and the Raiders later filed a defamation of character lawsuit against Noll, but lost. Following the 1983 regular season, the Los Angeles Raiders defeated the Steelers 38–10 in the AFC Divisional round which turned out to be the last NFL game for Steeler Pro Football Hall of Fame quarterback Terry Bradshaw who did not play due to injury.

While the rivalry has dissipated over the years (mostly due to Oakland's decline after 2002), the teams have had notable games against each other including an upset Steelers victory towards the end of the  season to prevent the Raiders from obtaining homefield advantage in the playoffs, and an upset Raiders victory in week 8 of the 2006 NFL season (20–13), which helped cost the Steelers a playoff berth. In Week 13 of the 2009 season, another Raiders upset victory happened; the game lead changed five times on five touchdowns in the fourth quarter until Raiders QB Bruce Gradkowski's third touchdown of the quarter won it with nine seconds to go. The 27–24 loss cost the Steelers another playoff run. The Raiders then hosted the Steelers in 2012 and erased a 31–21 gap to win 34–31. The two clubs met again in 2013 and the Raiders won again, 21–18. In 2015, the Steelers defeated the Raiders 38–35 at Heinz Field. The Steelers trail the all-time series 16–13 (13–10 in regular season). In their most recent matchup, the Raiders defeated the Steelers 24–21 on December 9, 2018, in Oakland, which, ironically, would cost Pittsburgh another playoff berth.

Dallas Cowboys
These teams hold a record for the most times (three) that two teams have met in a Super Bowl. The first two times the favored Steelers and Cowboys met came with Pittsburgh victories in the Orange Bowl Super Bowl X 21–17 and Super Bowl XIII 35–31. The Cowboys never won a regular-season game in the Orange Bowl and lost three Super Bowl games (once to the Baltimore Colts and twice to the Steelers). Between the Cowboys and Steelers, Super Bowl XIII had the greatest number of future Pro Football Hall of Fame players participating, which as of 2021 numbered 25 – 16 players and nine coaches/front office, including Ernie Stautner, defensive coordinator for the Cowboys who was a HoF defensive tackle for the Steelers. The teams featured an all-star matchup at quarterback between the Steelers' Terry Bradshaw and the Cowboys' Roger Staubach, both of whom are in the Hall of Fame. In , Staubach and the Cowboys won Super Bowl XII, their second and last loss of their season being inflicted by Bradshaw and the Steelers, 28–13 at Three Rivers Stadium in November. In , Staubach's final season, the two defending conference champs met again at Three Rivers, the Steelers winning 14–3 en route to winning their fourth Super Bowl title. The Steelers won six of eight meetings during the 1970s and 80s, before the Cowboys won all four meetings during the 1990s, including the teams' record third Super Bowl meeting in 1996, as this time the heavily favored Cowboys beat the Steelers 27–17. Dallas cornerback Larry Brown intercepted Pittsburgh quarterback Neil O'Donnell twice and was named the game's MVP. The teams' first two meetings of the 21st century ( and ) were won by the Steelers, including a come from behind victory on December 7, 2008, in Pittsburgh, when the Steelers drove the length of the field to tie the game 13–13, then cornerback Deshea Townsend returned an intercepted pass from Tony Romo for the game's final score, Steelers 20, Cowboys 13. The Cowboys won on December 16, 2012, at Cowboys Stadium by a 27–24 margin in overtime and won 35–30 at Heinz Field on November 13, 2016. The all-time series is led by the Dallas Cowboys, 17–16. The Pittsburgh/Dallas rivalry served as a backdrop to the 1977 film Black Sunday, parts of which were filmed during Super Bowl X. Most recently, the Steelers beat the Cowboys by a 24-19 margin.

Denver Broncos
The Denver Broncos in 2011 broke a tie with the Oakland Raiders for the most playoff meetings versus the Steelers and added yet another meeting in 2015 (the Broncos have met Pittsburgh eight times to Oakland's six). The following year, they met in the NFL's first regular-season overtime game, which ended in a 35–35 tie. Denver's first playoff game had them hosting the Steelers in the 1977 divisional round; the Broncos won 34–21. The following year, the Steelers hosted and defeated Denver 33–10 in the divisional round. Their next playoff matchup was the 1984 divisional round in Mile High Stadium; the Steelers pulled the upset 24–17. They nearly pulled the upset again 5 years later in Denver, but the Broncos prevailed in the divisional playoff, 24–23.

In 1997, the two teams met in Pittsburgh for the AFC Championship Game, where Denver squeaked out at 24–21 win. Eight years later, the Steelers advanced to Super Bowl XL by beating Denver 34–17 in Colorado. In 2011, after appearing in Super Bowl XLV, the Steelers had their campaign to repeat as AFC Champions dashed in Denver after a stunning overtime upset by the Tim Tebow-led Broncos in January 2012, in what would become known as the "316 game". The following September the Steelers were defeated in Denver 31–19 in Peyton Manning's debut as Broncos quarterback. The two clubs met twice in 2015, as the Steelers defeated the Broncos in the regular season but fell in the Divisional Round of the AFC playoffs; through the 2021 season, Denver leads the series 20–13–1, including 5–3 in the playoffs. Neither team has beaten the other more than three times in a row. In their last matchup, the Steelers beat the Broncos on October 10, 2021, in Pittsburgh by the score of 27–19.

New England Patriots
The New England Patriots emerged as a prominent rival in league circles when the Patriots upset the Steelers in the 2001 AFC Championship Game at Heinz Field, though the two teams had met in the postseason twice before; the Patriots defeated the Steelers in 1996 28-3 while the Steelers won 7–6 in 1997; both times, the Patriots fielded players with Pittsburgh-area roots in Ty Law and Curtis Martin. Martin's final game with the Patriots was in the 1997 playoffs before he departed to the rival New York Jets. Following the 2001 AFC title upset, the Patriots defeated the Steelers 30–14 at the start of the 2002 season. Pittsburgh did not exact revenge for the two losses until ending the Patriots' record-setting 21-game winning streak in week 6 of the 2004 NFL season. Later that season, the Steelers lost to the eventual Super Bowl champion Patriots in the AFC Championship game after a 15–1 regular season.

The Patriots in 2013 then made history by becoming the first opponent to score 55 points on the Steelers, winning 55–31. The Patriots won again in 2015 (28-21) and 2016's regular season (27-16), and then won 36–17 in the 2016 AFC Championship Game. They also won in 2017 when a go-ahead touchdown reception by Steelers' tight end Jesse James was controversially called back. Though they ultimately missed the playoffs, the Steelers defeated the Patriots by a score of 17–10 on December 16, 2018, in Pittsburgh.

In the postseason, the Patriots have outscored the Steelers 135–75, with the Patriots maintaining a 4–1 record. The only other franchises with winning AFC playoff records against Steelers include the Los Angeles Chargers (2–1), the Jacksonville Jaguars (2–0), and the Broncos (5–3). The Steelers have an all-time regular-season record of 15–13 against the Patriots. In the Bill Belichick era, the main period of the rivalry, the Patriots have a 12–4 record against the Steelers. In their last matchup, the Patriots beat the Steelers 33–3 on Sunday Night Football.

Philadelphia Eagles

The Philadelphia Eagles and Steelers are both located in Pennsylvania and began play in 1933. From that season through 1966, this was a major rivalry for both teams, as both were part of the same division. In 1967, they were placed in separate divisions, but remained in the same conference for three years. In 1970 the Steelers (along with the Cleveland Browns and Baltimore Colts) moved to the American Football Conference, while the Eagles stayed with the rest of the old-line NFL teams in the National Football Conference. As a result, the Eagles and Steelers no longer played each other every year; instead, they are scheduled to meet once every four years in the regular season. The most recent meeting was in 2022 at Lincoln Financial Field due to the addition of a regular season game based on opposing conference divisional finish from the season before, with the Eagles winning 35-13. The Steelers have lost ten straight games on the road against the Eagles dating back to 1966, which was also the start of the Super Bowl era. The Eagles lead the all-time series 49–29–3.

Tennessee Titans
Less well known is Pittsburgh's rivalry with the Houston Oilers/Tennessee Titans franchise. The Oilers were aligned into the AFC Central with the Steelers in 1970 and were division rivals for 32 seasons. The Steelers dominated the rivalry during the Houston era and defeated the Oilers in all three of their playoff matchups. However, since the franchise moved to Tennessee in 1997, the rivalry shifted, with the Titans winning 13 of 22 meetings (including a bitter 34–31 playoff showdown in 2002); the Titans won seven in a row in the 1997–2001 period, the longest win streak by either team in the series. The Steelers have won 47 of 79 career meetings following their 27–24 win at Nissan Stadium in 2020.

Culture

Mascot 

Prior to the  season, the Steelers introduced Steely McBeam as their official mascot. As part of the 75th anniversary celebrations of the team, his name was selected from a pool of 70,000 suggestions submitted by fans of the team. Diane Roles of Middlesex Township, submitted the winning name which was "meant to represent steel for Pittsburgh's industrial heritage, "Mc" for the Rooney family's Irish roots, and Beam for the steel beams produced in Pittsburgh, as well as for Jim Beam, her husband's favorite alcoholic beverage." Steely McBeam is visible at all home games and participates in the team's charitable programs and other club-sponsored events. Steely's autograph is known to be drawn with an oversized S, and the L is drawn to look like a beam of steel.

Fanbase 

The Steelers have a tradition of having a large fanbase, which has spread from Pittsburgh. In August 2008, ESPN.com ranked the Steelers' fans as the best in the NFL, citing their "unbelievable" sellout streak of 299 consecutive games. The team gained a large fan base nationally based on its success in the 1970s, but many consider the collapse of the city's steel industry at the end of the 1970s dynasty into the 1980s (and the resulting diaspora) to be a large catalyst for the size of the fan base in other cities. The Steelers have sold out every home game since the  season.

The Pittsburgh Steelers have numerous unofficial fan clubs in many cities throughout the country, that typically meet in bars or taverns on game days.  This phenomenon is known to occur for other NFL teams as well, but "Steeler bars" are more visible than most, including representative establishments even in cities that field their own NFL teams.

The Terrible Towel has been described by the Associated Press as "arguably the best-known fan symbol of any major pro sports team". Since 1996, proceeds from the Terrible Towel have helped raise more than $2.5 million for the school.

Fight songs 
The Steelers have no official fight song, but many fan versions of "Here We Go Steelers" and the "Steelers Polka" (the latter a parody of "Pennsylvania Polka") by ethnic singer Jimmy Pol, both originating in the 1970s, have been recorded. Since 1994, the song "Here We Go" by local singer Roger Wood has been popular among fans. Since 2002, the 1979 Styx song "Renegade" is played near the end of the third quarter or the start of the fourth quarter at the start of a defensive stand to rally the crowd, featuring a compilation of recent Steelers defensive highlights. Another song from hometown rapper Wiz Khalifa, "Black and Yellow", which is an ode to growing up in Pittsburgh, is also a standard part of the Steelers home game experience.

Cheerleaders

The Steelers were the first NFL team to have a cheerleading squad, they were known as the Steelerettes. Their run only lasted from 1961 to 1969. To this day, they were the only cheerleaders the team had in their history.

Basketball 
During the offseason, the Steelers have long participated in charity basketball games throughout Western Pennsylvania and neighboring areas. The games usually feature six active players as well as their player-coach playing against a group of local civic leaders. The players, whose participants aren't announced until the day of the game, sign free autographs for fans during halftime.

Facilities

Stadiums 

In 2001, the Steelers moved into Heinz Field. The franchise dating back to 1933 has had several homes. For 31 seasons, the Steelers shared Forbes Field with the Pittsburgh Pirates from 1933 to 1963. In 1958, though they started splitting their home games at Pitt Stadium three blocks away at the University of Pittsburgh. From 1964 to 1969, the Steelers played exclusively at the on-campus facility before moving with the Pirates to Three Rivers Stadium on the city's Northside. Three Rivers is remembered fondly by the Steeler Nation as where Chuck Noll and Dan Rooney turned the franchise into a powerhouse, winning four Super Bowls in just six seasons and making the playoffs 11 times in 13 seasons from 1972 to 1984, the AFC title game seven times. Since 2001, however, a new generation of Steeler greats has made Heinz Field legendary, with multiple AFC Championship Games being hosted and two Super Bowl championships. In February 2022, after Heinz declined to sign a new deal after naming rights expired, the Steelers signed a deal with Acrisure and renamed the stadium to Acrisure Stadium.

Training camp 

The Steelers hold training camp east of the city at Saint Vincent College in Latrobe. The site is one of the most storied in the league with Peter King of SI.com describing it as: "... I love the place. It's the perfect training-camp setting, looking out over the rolling hills of the Laurel Highlands in west-central Pennsylvania, an hour east of Pittsburgh. On a misty or foggy morning, standing atop the hill at the college, you feel like you're in Scotland. Classic, wonderful slice of American culture. If you can visit one training camp, this is the one to see."

The team has its headquarters and practice facilities at the state-of-the-art University of Pittsburgh Medical Center Sportsplex on Pittsburgh's Southside. Constructed in 2000, the facility combines the vast expertise of sports medical professionals and researchers as well as hosting the University of Pittsburgh Panthers football team.

In 2020 and 2021, due to the COVID-19 pandemic, the Steelers held their training camp at Heinz Field. They returned to Saint Vincent College for the 2022 season.

Historical facilities 
The Rooney family has long had a close relationship with Duquesne University in the city and from the teams founding in the 1930s to the late 1990s used Art Rooney Field and other facilities on campus as either its primary or secondary in-season training site as well as Greenlee Field during the 1930s.

In the 1970s and 1980s, the team had season scrimmages at South Park in the suburban south hills of Pittsburgh.  During various seasons including the strike season of 1987, the Steelers used Point Stadium in nearby Johnstown for game week practices.  During the 1950s St. Bonaventure University and suburban Ligonier also served as a pre-season training camp sites.

Statistics

Players of note

Current roster

Retired uniform numbers 

The Steelers retired Stautner's #70 in 1964 before creating a 50-year tradition of not retiring numbers. The team retired Greene's #75 in 2014 and left the possibility open that they would retire other players' jersey numbers at later dates. However, several numbers have not been reissued since the retirement of the players who wore them, including:

1 Gary Anderson
7 Ben Roethlisberger
12 Terry Bradshaw
36 Jerome Bettis
43 Troy Polamalu
47 Mel Blount
52 Mike Webster
58 Jack Lambert
59 Jack Ham
63 Dermontti Dawson
86 Hines Ward

Pro Football Hall of Famers

"Primary" inductees 
The Steelers boast the third most "primary" inductees into the Pro Football Hall of Fame, i.e. inductees that spent most or all of their NFL careers in Pittsburgh.  They also can claim the most honorees of any franchise founded on or after  and the only franchise with three members of ownership in the Hall of Fame.

Award recipients 
Rocky Bleier, former Steeler running back received the Purple Heart, Bronze Star and the Combat Infantryman Badge while serving in the Army in Vietnam.
Pat Livingston, Steelers beat writer for the Pittsburgh Press, awarded the 1979 Dick McCann Memorial Award
Vito Stellino, Steelers beat writer in the 1970s for the Pittsburgh Post-Gazette, awarded the 1989 Dick McCann Memorial Award
Myron Cope, Announcer (1970–2005), awarded the 2005 Pro Football Hall of Fame's Pete Rozelle Radio-Television Award
John Clayton, Steelers beat writer for the Pittsburgh Press (1976–1986), awarded the 2007 Dick McCann Memorial Award

Steelers in the Hall for contributions elsewhere

Pro Bowl players 
The following Steelers players have been named to the Pro Bowl:
QB Ben Roethlisberger (6), Kordell Stewart, Neil O'Donnell, Terry Bradshaw (3), Bobby Layne (2), Earl Morrall, Jim Finks
FB Roosevelt Nix, Earnest Jackson, Franco Harris (9), John Henry Johnson (3), Fran Rogel, Dick Riffle, John Karcis, Stu Smith
HB Najee Harris, James Conner, Le'Veon Bell (3), Willie Parker (2), Jerome Bettis (4), Barry Foster (2), Dick Hoak, Clendon Thomas, Tom Tracy (2), Ray Mathews (2), Johnny Lattner, Lynn Chandnois (2), Joe Geri (2), Bill Dudley, Merl Condit, Whizzer White
LT Alejandro Villanueva (2), Marvel Smith, Charlie Bradshaw (2), Joe Coomer
LG Alan Faneca (7), Duval Love, Mike Sandusky, Byron Gentry (2)
C Maurkice Pouncey (9), Jeff Hartings (2), Dermontti Dawson (7), Mike Webster (9), Buzz Nutter, Bill Walsh (2), Chuck Cherundolo (2), Mike Basrak
RG David DeCastro (6), Carlton Haselrig, Bruce Van Dyke, John Nisby (2), Milt Simington
RT Tunch Ilkin (2), Larry Brown, Frank Varrichione (4), George Hughes (2), John Woudenberg
TE Heath Miller (2), Eric Green (2), Preston Carpenter, Jack McClairen, Elbie Nickel (3)
WR Diontae Johnson, JuJu Smith-Schuster, Antonio Brown (6), Mike Wallace, Hines Ward (4), Yancey Thigpen (2), Louis Lipps (2), John Stallworth (4), Lynn Swann (3), Ron Shanklin, Roy Jefferson (2), Gary Ballman (2), Buddy Dial (2), Jimmy Orr
DE Cameron Heyward, Brett Keisel, Aaron Smith, L. C. Greenwood (6), Dwight White (2), Ben McGee (2), Lou Michaels (2), Bill McPeak (3)
DT Cameron Heyward (5), Casey Hampton (5), Joel Steed, Joe Greene (10), Joe Krupa, Gene Lipscomb, Ernie Stautner (9)
LB T. J. Watt (5), Ryan Shazier (2), Lawrence Timmons, James Harrison (5), LaMarr Woodley, James Farrior (2), Joey Porter (3), Jason Gildon (3), Kendrell Bell, Levon Kirkland (2), Chad Brown, Kevin Greene (2), Greg Lloyd (5), David Little, Mike Merriweather (3), Robin Cole, Jack Lambert (9), Jack Ham (8), Andy Russell (7), Myron Pottios (3), John Reger (3), Dale Dodrill (4), Marv Matuszak, Jerry Shipkey (3)
CB Joe Haden, Rod Woodson (7), Mel Blount (5), J.T. Thomas, Marv Woodson, Brady Keys, Dean Derby, Jack Butler (4), Art Jones
SS Troy Polamalu (8), Carnell Lake (4), Donnie Shell (5), Mike Wagner (2)
FS Minkah Fitzpatrick (3), Ryan Clark, Glen Edwards (2)
PK Chris Boswell, Gary Anderson (3), Roy Gerela (2), Mike Clark
P Bobby Walden
RS Antonio Brown, Rod Woodson

NFL MVPs

Defensive Player of the Year Awards winners

Rookie of the Year Award winners

Super Bowl MVPs

NFL All-Decade Teams 
The following Steelers were named to NFL All-Decade Teams (and 75th and 100th Anniversary All-Time Teams, selected in 1994 and 2019, respectively). Only those who spent time with Pittsburgh during the respective decades are listed.
Bold indicates those elected to the Pro Football Hall of Fame.

All-time team 
In , in celebration of the franchise's 75th season, the team announced an updated All-Time team of the 33 best players who have ever played for the Steelers.

A "Legends team" consisting of the club's best pre-1970s players was released concurrently with the latest All-Time team.

Dapper Dan Sportsman of the Year 

The regional Dapper Dan Charities has since 1939 named the "Sportsman of the Year" in the Pittsburgh region. 19 Steelers have won the award in 23 events:
1941 Aldo Donelli
1942 Bill Dudley
1946 Bill Dudley
1950 Joe Geri
1952 Red Dawson
1955 John Michelosen
1962 Lou Michaels & John Michelosen
1968 Dick Hoak
1972 Chuck Noll
1974 Joe Greene
1975 Terry Bradshaw
1977 Franco Harris
1984 John Stallworth
1985 Louis Lipps
1992 Bill Cowher
1994 Bill Cowher
1997 Jerome Bettis
2001 Kordell Stewart
2004 Ben Roethlisberger
2005 Jerome Bettis
2008 Mike Tomlin
2014 Antonio Brown
2015 Antonio Brown
2018 James Conner

Hall of Honor 
The Pittsburgh Steelers Hall of Honor was established on August 1, 2017. There have been 49 inductees.

Coaches 

The Steelers have had 16 coaches through their history. They have cycled through the fewest head coaches in the modern NFL history. Their first coach was Forrest Douds, who coached them to a 3–6–2 record in 1933. Chuck Noll had the longest term as head coach with the Steelers; he is one of only four coaches to coach a single NFL team for 23 years. Hired prior to the 2007 season, the Steelers current coach is Mike Tomlin.

Current staff

Offensive coordinator history 
Source:

Defensive coordinator history 
Source:

Media 

As of 2006, the Steelers' flagship radio stations were WDVE 102.5 FM and WBGG 970 AM. Both stations are owned by iHeartMedia. Games are also available on 51 radio stations in Pennsylvania, Western Maryland, Ohio, and Northern West Virginia. The announcers are Bill Hillgrove and Tunch Ilkin. Craig Wolfley is the sideline reporter. Myron Cope, the longtime color analyst and inventor of the "Terrible Towel", retired after the 2004 season, and died in 2008.

Pre-season games not shown on one of the national broadcasters are seen on CBS O&O KDKA-TV, channel 2; sister CW O&O WPCW, channel 19; and AT&T SportsNet Pittsburgh. KDKA-TV's Bob Pompeani and former Steelers quarterback Charlie Batch do the announcing for the pre-season games, as well as the two hosting the pre-game program Steelers Kickoff during the regular season prior to the national airing of The NFL Today. Pompeani and former Steelers lineman Chris Hoke also host the Xfinity Xtra Point following the game on days when CBS does not have that week's NFL doubleheader. When CBS has a week's doubleheader, the show airs on WPCW. Coach Mike Tomlin's weekly press conference is shown live on AT&T SportsNet Pittsburgh. Both Batch and Hoke replaced former Steelers lineman Edmund Nelson, who retired from broadcasting in 2015.

Thursday Night Football broadcasts are shown locally on Fox affiliate WPGH-TV, channel 53 (along with home games with NFC opponents and some flexed interconference games), while ESPN Monday Night Football broadcasts are shown locally on WTAE-TV, channel 4. (WTAE-TV is owned by the Hearst Corporation, which owns a 20% stake in ESPN.) By virtue of being members of the AFC, most of the Steelers' games air on CBS and KDKA. NBC Sunday Night Football games are carried by WPXI, channel 11, in the market.

The Steelers hold a national contract with Grupo Imagen for radio rights to their games in Mexico; Imagen broadcasts the Steelers on their stations in 17 Mexican cities.

Figures with broadcasting résumés 

The Steelers franchise has a rich history of producing well-known sportscasters over the years. The most famous of these is probably Myron Cope, who served as a Steelers radio color commentator for 35 seasons (–).

Several former Steelers players have gone on to careers in media after completing their playing careers.

Newspaper 
The Steelers Digest is the only official newspaper for the Pittsburgh Steelers. It has been published for 22 years and is currently published by Dolphin/Curtis Publishing in Miami, Florida, which also handles several other publications. The newspaper is very widely acknowledged by Steelers fans. Issues are mailed out to paying subscribers weekly through the season after every regular-season game and continue through playoffs as long as the Steelers do. After a Super Bowl victory, a bonus issue is published, which is followed by a draft preview, draft recap, and training camp edition every other month, then leading into the pre-season. There are typically 24 issues of the paper within a publishing year. The newspaper is listed on the official Steelers.com page.

Usage in popular culture 
The Steelers' success over several decades has permeated film and literature.  The Steelers are portrayed in the following big-budget Hollywood films:
The January 11, 1975 episode of the Mary Tyler Moore Show featured Super Bowl IX (featuring the Steelers) as a plot device.
Black Sunday in 1977
Heaven Can Wait in 1978
Smokey and the Bandit II in 1980
Fighting Back in 1980
Hey Kid, Catch! in 1980
...All the Marbles in 1981
Evening Shade (TV series) 1990–1994
The Waterboy cameo by Bill Cowher in 1998
The Longest Yard in 2005
The Chief a theater production.
Black and Yellow in 2010.
The Dark Knight Rises in 2012 features several Steelers players as the fictional Gotham Rogues, which was filmed in Heinz Field
Mad Men's April 14, 2013 episode has Don Draper, Pete Campbell and Roger Sterling meeting with two HJ Heinz executives. The executives are told that not only would the ad firm have given them tickets to the Steelers' November 19, 1967 game at the Giants, the firm would have worked it so that the Steelers would have won (they lost 20–28).
Concussion in 2015 features players from the team suffering from CTE.

The protagonist of John Grisham's novel "The Associate" is a staunch Steelers fan.

In the summer of 2019, the Kennywood theme park located near Pittsburgh, opened a new land themed to the Pittsburgh Steelers, Steelers Country, featuring a major record-breaking coaster, the Steel Curtain. The land, in addition to this ride, features a Steelers-themed experience, and an 'End Zone Restaurant'.

The Chuck Noll Foundation for Brain Injury Research 
The Steelers helped launch the Chuck Noll Foundation for Brain Injury Research in November 2016 by donating $1 million.  The Foundation, started by Steelers president Art Rooney II, focuses on education and research regarding brain injuries and sports-related concussions.

In June 2017, the Steelers announced an inaugural charity walk to raise money for the foundation.

See also 
 Active NFL playoff appearance streaks
 Pittsburgh Pro Football Hall of Fame

Notes

References

Further reading

External links 

 
 Pittsburgh Steelers at the National Football League official website

 
National Football League teams
Steagles
American football teams established in 1933